Tegula atra is a species of sea snail, a marine gastropod mollusk in the family Tegulidae.

Description
The size of the shell varies between 24 mm and 62 mm. The heavy, solid, imperforate shell has a  conical shape and is more or less depressed. It is lusterless black. The about six whorls are, moderately convex, separated by impressed sutures. They are smooth, except for slight incremental striae. The body whorl is more or less depressed, and rounded or subangular at the periphery. The base of the shell is flattened, concave in the center, eroded and light purplish in front of the aperture. The aperture is very oblique.  The outer lip is black-margined, smooth and pearly within. The columella is oblique, obtusely dentate in the middle. The umbilico-columellar tract is covered by a white callus, excavated at the position of the umbilicus, and bearing a spiral rib.

Distribution
This species occurs in the Pacific Ocean off the Strait of Magellan (Chile) to Peru.

References

 Rehder, H.A. (1980). The marine mollusks of Easter Island (Isla de Pascura) and Sala y Gomez. Smithsonian Contributions to Zoology. 289 : 1-167

External links
 To Biodiversity Heritage Library (10 publications)
 To Encyclopedia of Life
 To GenBank (7 nucleotides; 2 proteins)
 To World Register of Marine Species
 

ater
Gastropods described in 1830